Martino Bassi (1542–1591) was an Italian architect active in the Renaissance period, mainly in Milan. He was born in Seregno near Milan. He was involved in a public dispute regarding the baptistery of the Cathedral of Milan. He helped build the imposing facade of Santa Maria presso San Celso. He also built the church of Santa Maria al Paradiso.

References
{{cite book | first= Stefano| last= Ticozzi| year=1830| title= Dizionario degli architetti, scultori, pittori, intagliatori in rame ed in pietra, coniatori di medaglie, musaicisti, niellatori, intarsiatori d'ogni etá e d'ogni nazione''' (Volume 1)| pages= 122–3 | publisher=Gaetano Schiepatti |location=Milan | url= https://books.google.com/books?id=0ownAAAAMAAJ&q=Stefano+Ticozzi+Dizionario&pg=PA5 }}

Bibliography
C.Baroni, L'architettura lombarda da Bramante al Richini, Milan, 1941
F.B.Ferrari, Vita di Martino Bassi, architetto milanese (Life of Martino Bassi, Milanese Architect), Brescia, 1771

Further readingDispareri in materia d'architettura, et perspettiva, Brescia, 1572 Dispareri in materia d'architettura, et perspettiva'', Milan, 1771 

1542 births
1591 deaths
People from Seregno
16th-century Italian architects
Renaissance architects
Architects from Milan